The 2020–21 season was the 31st season in existence of İstanbul Başakşehir and the seventh consecutive season in the top flight of Turkish football, the Süper Lig. In addition to the domestic league, Başakşehir participated in this season's editions of the Turkish Cup, the Turkish Super Cup and the UEFA Champions League. The season covered the period from 5 August 2020 to 30 June 2021.

Players

First-team squad

Out on loan

Transfers

In

Out

Pre-season and friendlies

Competitions

Overview

Süper Lig

League table

Results summary

Results by round

Matches

Turkish Cup

Turkish Super Cup

UEFA Champions League

Group stage

The group stage draw was held on 1 October 2020.

Statistics

Goalscorers

Notes

References

External links

İstanbul Başakşehir F.K. seasons
İstanbul Başakşehir F.K.
2020–21 UEFA Champions League participants seasons